Major League Baseball (MLB) has played multiple regular season neutral site games in the United States at stadiums that are not the home ballpark of an MLB team. Such contests have been arranged by MLB for marketing purposes since the late 1990s, with increasing frequency. Listed below are the results of those games. Exhibition contests, such as preseason games or postseason all-star games, are not included. Also not included are games played in temporary home ballparks, such as by the Toronto Blue Jays during their 2020 and 2021 seasons.

Neutral site games played in the United States

Notes
 The Cleveland Bronchos moved two of their 1902 games to Fort Wayne because laws against Sunday games were enforced in Cleveland but not in Fort Wayne. The venue, League Park, was also called Jail Flats after its general location.
 The 1997 Padres Paradise Series in Honolulu were the first regular-season MLB games played in Hawaii. The April 19 games were a twi-night doubleheader with attendance reported only for the second game.
 The Cleveland Indians moved three of their 2007 games to Milwaukee due to a heavy snowstorm in Cleveland.
 The Houston Astros moved two of their 2008 games to Milwaukee due to the effects of Hurricane Ike.
 The 2016 Fort Bragg game was the first MLB game played on an active military base and the first MLB game played in the state of North Carolina. Only veterans, active military personnel, and family were allowed to be spectators at the game.
 The 2019 MLB in Omaha game was the first MLB game played in the state of Nebraska.
 The 2021 MLB at Field of Dreams Game was the first MLB game played in the state of Iowa. A random drawing for the opportunity to purchase tickets for the game directly from MLB was restricted to residents of Iowa.

See also
List of Major League Baseball games played outside the United States and Canada

Notes

References

Major League Baseball lists